Liolaemus avilae is a species of lizard in the family  Liolaemidae. It is native to Argentina.

References

avilae
Reptiles described in 2011
Reptiles of Argentina
Taxa named by Jack W. Sites Jr.
Taxobox binomials not recognized by IUCN